The Lilydale line is a commuter railway line in the city of Melbourne, Victoria, Australia. The line runs from Flinders Street station in central Melbourne to Lilydale station in the east, serving 27 stations via Burnley, Box Hill, Ringwood, and Croydon. The line operates for approximately 19 hours a day (from approximately 5:00 am to around 12:00 am) with 24 hour service available on Friday and Saturday nights. During peak hour, headways of up to 15 minutes are operated with services every 20-30 minutes during off-peak hours. Trains on the Lilydale line run with a two three-car formations of X'Trapolis 100 trainsets.

Sections of the Lilydale line opened as early as 1859, with the line fully extended to Lilydale by 1882. The line was built to connect Melbourne and Ringwood with the rural towns of Croydon, Mooroolbark, and Lilydale, amongst others. 

Since the 2010s, due to the heavily utilised infrastructure of the Lilydale line, significant improvements and upgrades have been made. Different packages of works have upgraded the corridor to replace sleepers, upgrading signalling technology, the introduction of new rolling stock, and the removal of all remaining level crossings.

History

19th century 
The line from Richmond to Hawthorn was opened initially to a temporary terminus at Pic Nic, just short of the Yarra River, in September 1860, and to Hawthorn in April 1861. It was extended to Camberwell in April 1882, then to Lilydale in early December of that same year. Duplication from East Richmond to Hawthorn occurred less than a month after the Lilydale extension opened. A two weeks later the same section was converted to Double Line Block Telegraph safeworking, with the section from Hawthorn to Camberwell being converted to Staff and Ticket working.

In May 1885, Hawthorn to Camberwell was duplicated and converted to Double Line Block Telegraph. Duplication was extended to Box Hill in December 1888.

20th century 

Automatic signalling was introduced from December 1907 with the conversion of the section from East Richmond to Hawthorn to semi-automatic signalling, followed by Richmond to East Richmond being converted to automatic signalling in August 1919. East Richmond to Camberwell was converted in two stages both in October 1922 and Camberwell to Canterbury the following month. Electrification occurred between Flinders Street and Box Hill in December 1922, and extended to Ringwood the following month, then to Croydon in November 1925 and finally to Lilydale in October 1925. Conversion to automatic signalling resumed in April 1927 with the conversion of Canterbury to Surrey Hills, followed by Surrey Hills to Box Hill in October 1929.

The section from Croydon to Mooroolbark was duplicated in 1957, creating a long passing loop on this otherwise single-line section beyond Ringwood. The section from Mooroolbark to Lilydale remains a single track. Automatic signalling conversions resumed in July 1958 with the section from Box Hill to Blackburn, followed by Mitcham to Ringwood in September of that year, and Blackburn to Mitcham in November 1960. Hawthorn to Camberwell was triplicated in December 1963, and the triplication was extended to East Camberwell in November 1964. Richmond to Burnley was quadruplicated in 1966-67, and triplication was extended to Box Hill in December 1971, followed by Burnley to Hawthorn in August 1972. This left a short section of double track on the up side of Richmond, but this was quadruplicated with the construction of a flyover in 1973.

Ringwood to Croydon was converted to automatic signalling in November 1973 and duplicated in June 1984. Mooroolbark to Lilydale was converted to automatic signalling in June 1985.

The Comeng trains were introduced to the Melbourne railway system in 1981. Initially, along with the Lilydale line, they were only allowed to operate on the Alamein, Belgrave, Dandenong and Glen Waverley lines, due to the width of the trains.

21st century 
A 2007 restructure of train ticketing in Melbourne involved the removal of Zone 3, with Zone 3 stations being re-classified to Zone 2. This brought the cost of train fares down, improving system accessibility to the public.

Future

Level Crossing Removals 

The Level Crossing Removal Project has announced the removal of all 9 remaining level crossings on the Lilydale line, to be completed in stages from 2016 to 2025. In 2016, 2 level crossings were removed at Mountain Highway and Scoresby Road, Bayswater, through the rail under method. These two removals also included a rebuilt Bayswater station and upgraded stabling facilities. A further two crossings were removed at Blackburn Road, Blackburn, and Heatherdale Road, Ringwood in January 2017. Both of these removals involved lowering the rail line under the roads with a rebuilt Heatherdale station built as part of the project. In 2021, an additional two level crossings were removed at Manchester Rd, Mooroolbark, and Maroondah Highway, Lilydale. These two removals included two new elevated stations at Mooroolbark and Lilydale. Union and Mont Albert Roads have also been removed by lowering the rail line in May 2023. The removals also included closing Mont Albert and Surrey Hills stations with a new station built in-between called "Union." The final two crossings to be removed will include lowering the rail line below Dublin Road in Ringwood East, with a new Ringwood East station, to be completed by 2025, and the removal of Coolstore Road in Croydon by 2025. The Coolstore Road level crossing removal will also include a newly elevated Croydon station. In addition, the level crossing at Cave Hill Road in Lilydale will be permanently closed by 2025.

Duplication 
The Network Development Plan [for] Metropolitan Rail, released in 2012, highlighted future upgrades for the rail corridor between Mooroolbark and Lilydale. The development plan highlighted the need for the track to be duplicated between Moroolbark and Lilydale as well as the construction of a new train maintenance facility in the Lilydale area within the next 20 years (by 2032). These upgrades would ensure that the Lilydale line could accommodate higher capacity trains and more services due to the growing importance of the line.

Network and operations

Services 
Services on the Lilydale line operates from approximately 5:00 am to around 12:00 daily. In general, during peak hours, train frequency is ~7 minutes on the Ringwood corridor (combined with the Belgrave line) and 10-20 minutes in the AM peak on the Lilydale line while during non-peak hours the frequency is reduced to 20–30 minutes throughout the entire route. On Friday nights and weekends, services run 24 hours a day, with 60 minute frequencies available outside of normal operating hours.

Train services on the Lilydale line are also subjected to maintenance and renewal works, usually on selected Fridays and Saturdays. Shuttle bus services are provided throughout the duration of works for affected commuters.

Stopping patterns 
Legend — Station status
 ◼ Premium Station – Station staffed from first to last train
 ◻ Host Station – Usually staffed during morning peak, however this can vary for different stations on the network.

Legend — Stopping patternsSome services do not operate via the City Loop
 ● – All trains stop
 ◐ – Some services do not stop
 | – Trains pass and do not stop

Operators 
The Lilydale line has had a total of 6 operators since its opening in 1882. The majority of operations throughout its history have been government run: from its first service in 1882 until the 1997 privatisation of Melbourne's rail network, three different government operators have run the line. These operators, Victorian Railways, the Metropolitan Transit Authority, and the Public Transport Corporation have a combined operational length of 115 years. In comparison, the three private operators, Hillside Trains, Connex Melbourne, and Metro Trains Melbourne have had a combined operational period of  years.

Route 

The Lilydale line forms a mostly curved route from the Melbourne central business district to its terminus in Lilydale. Finally, the line narrows to two tracks between Box Hill and Mooroolbark before narrowing to a single track to its terminus. After Mooroolbark, passing loops and island platforms are present at throughout the remaining track to allow trains to pass. After departing from its terminus at Flinders Street, the Lilydale line traverses both flat and hilly country with some curves (more towards the end of the line) and fairly significant earthworks for parts of the line. Sections of the line have been elevated or lowered into a cutting to eliminate level crossings. The line will be fully grade seperated by 2025.

The line follows the same alignment as the Alamein, Belgrave, and Glen Waverley lines with the four services splitting onto different routes at Burnley. The Alamein, Belgrave, and Lilydale services continue till the Alamein line splits off at Camberwell, with the two services continuing together till Ringwood. After departing Ringwood station, the Lilydale line heads north with the Belgrave line heading in an eastern direction. Almost all of the rail line goes through built-up suburbs, however, the rail line becomes peri-urban towards its terminus in Lilydale.

Stations 
The line serves 27 stations across  of track. The stations are a mix of elevated, lowered, underground, and ground level designs. Underground stations are present only in the City Loop and in Box Hill, with the majority of elevated and lowered stations being constructed as part of level crossing removals. From 2025, Ringwood East station will be lowered and Croydon station elevated as part of level crossing removal works.

Infrastructure

Rolling stock 

The Lilydale line uses X'Trapolis 100 electric multiple unit (EMU) trains operating in a two three-car configuration, with three doors per side on each carriage and can accommodate of up to 432 seated passengers in each six car configuration. The trains were originally built between 2002 and 2004 as well as between 2009 and 2020 with a total of 212 three-car sets constructed. The trains are shared with 7 other metropolitan train lines and have been in service since 2003.

Alongside the passenger trains, Lilydale line tracks and equipment are maintained by a fleet of engineering trains. The four types of engineering trains are: the shunting train; designed for moving trains along non-electrified corridors and for transporting other maintenance locomotives, for track evaluation; designed for evaluating track and its condition, the overhead inspection train; designed for overhead wiring inspection, and the infrastructure evaluation carriage designed for general infrastructure evaluation. Most of these trains are repurposed locomotives previously used by V/Line, Metro Trains, and the Southern Shorthaul Railroad.

Accessibility 

In compliance with the Disability Discrimination Act of 1992, all stations that are new-built or rebuilt are fully accessible and comply with these guidelines. Half of stations on the corridor are fully accessible, however, there are some stations that haven't been upgraded to meet these guidelines. These stations do feature ramps, however, they have a gradient greater than 1 in 14. Stations that are fully accessible feature ramps that have a gradient less than 1 in 14, have at-grade paths, or feature lifts. These stations typically also feature tactile boarding indicators, independent boarding ramps, wheelchair accessible myki barriers, hearing loops, and widened paths.

Projects improving station accessibility have included the Level Crossing Removal Project, which involves station rebuilds and upgrades, and individual station upgrade projects. These works have made significant strides in improving network accessibility, with more than 59% of Lilydale line stations classed as fully accessible. Future station upgrade projects will continue to increase the number of fully accessible stations overtime.

Signalling 
The Lilydale line uses three position signalling with automatic block signaling(ABS) and automatic and track control (ATC) safeworking systems. Three position signalling was first introduced on the line in 1919, with the final section of the line converted to the new type of signalling by 1985. Automatic and track control is used with the centre line between Burnley and Box Hill, and between Mooroolbark and the line's terminus in Lilydale.

References

Further reading

External links
 Lilydale line timetable
 Network map
 

Railway lines in Melbourne
Railway lines opened in 1860
Transport in the Shire of Yarra Ranges
1860 establishments in Australia
Public transport routes in the City of Melbourne (LGA)
Transport in the City of Yarra
Transport in the City of Boroondara
Transport in the City of Whitehorse
Transport in the City of Maroondah